Georges Hatz (11 May 1917 – 12 May 2007) was a French football player and manager. He played as a goalkeeper and was part of the Lille OSC side that won the Division 1 and Coupe de France double in 1946.

External links
Georges Hatz profile at chamoisfc79.fr

1917 births
2007 deaths
French footballers
French football managers
Association football goalkeepers
Red Star F.C. players
Lille OSC players
Stade Rennais F.C. players
AJ Auxerre managers
Chamois Niortais F.C. managers
Ligue 1 players